Nationality words link to articles with information on the nation's poetry or literature (for instance, Irish or France).

Events

 July 21 – Death of the Scottish national poet, Robert Burns ("Rabbie Burns", "Scotland's favourite son", "the Ploughman Poet", "the Bard (of Ayrshire)"), in Dumfries, at the age of 37. His funeral (with honours as a military volunteer) takes place on July 25 while his wife, Jean, is in labour with their ninth child together, Maxwell. Burns is at first buried in the far corner of St. Michael's Churchyard in Dumfries. The volume of The Scots Musical Museum published this year includes his versions of the Scots poem "Auld Lang Syne" and "Charlie Is My Darling".

Works published in English

United Kingdom
 Mary Matilda Betham, Elegies, and Other Small Poems
 William Lisle Bowles, Hope
 Sir James Burges, The Birth and Triumph of Love
 Samuel Taylor Coleridge:
 Ode on the Departing Year
 Poems on Various Subjects including "Lines Written at Shurton Bars", the first full publication of "Religious Musings" and a revised version of "Monody on the Death of Chatterton"
 M. G. Lewis, published anonymously, Village Virtues
 Sir Walter Scott, The Chase, and William and Helen, translation (published anonymously) from the German of Gottfried August Burger's Der Wilde Jager and Lenora (See William Taylor, below)
 Robert Southey:
Joan of Arc

 Poems, partly a reprint of poems originally published in 1795 and partly new works, including "After Blenheim" (see also Poems 1799 and Minor Poems 1813)
 William Taylor, Ellenore, translation (published anonymously) from the German of Gottfried August Burger's Lenora) (see Sir Walter Scott, above)
 Ann Yearsley, The Rural Lyre

United States
 Joel Barlow. The Hasty Pudding, a mock epic on the virtues of cornmeal mush, written in France; it became Barlow's most popular work
 William Cliffton, The Group; or, An Elegant Representation, political verses defending Jay's Treaty and a satire on common people ignorantly discussing politics
 Lemuel Hopkins, "The Guillotina; or, A Democratic Dirge", a New Year's poem praising George Washington and Alexander Hamilton while attacking Thomas Jefferson and his party
 John Blair Linn, The Poetical Wanderer
 Thomas Morris, Quashy; or, The Coal-Black Maid, the author's most notable poem, describing the life of a black slave in Martinique and criticizing the British and French systems of slavery
 Robert Treat Paine, Jr., The Ruling Passion
 Isaac Story, "All the World's a Stage", published under the pen name "The Stranger", blank verse; includes popular satirical sketches
 St. George Tucker, The Probationary Odes of Jonathan Pindar, popular book of anti-Federalist satires on Alexander Hamilton, John Adams and others; written in the style of John Wolcot, who wrote under the pen name "Peter Pindar"; first published in 1793 in The National Gazette, which was edited by Philip Freneau, so the poems have been wrongly attributed to Freneau.

Works published in other languages

Germany
 Johann von Goethe and Friedrich Schiller, Musenalmanach für das Jahr 1797, published in October, including hundreds of epigrams, both cuttingly satirical (Xenien) and "tame" (zahm), constructive general comments on literature and art:
 Xenien, 414 satirical epigrams targeting critics but with a broader aim of denouncing narrow-mindedness and poor-thinking among intellectuals, with each epigram a classical distich composed of a hexameter and pentameter; published in October in Musenalmanach für das Jahr 1797; principal critics targeted were L. H. Jakob, J. K. F. Manso, and F. Nicolai; deep offense and bitter reaction resulted
 Tabulae votivae, 124 "tame" distichs organized into 103 tabulae
 Vielen, 18 "tame" distichs
 Einer, 19 "tame" distichs presented as a single, continuous poem
 J. H. Voss, Homers Werke,  one of the most widely read German translations of Homer

Births
Death years link to the corresponding "[year] in poetry" article:
 May 15 – Charlotte Caroline Richardson (died 1854), English
 June 14 – Mathilda d'Orozco (died 1863), Swedish, originally Spanish-Italian
 July 26 – Christian Winther (died 1876), Danish poet and tutor
 September 19 – Hartley Coleridge (died 1849), English writer and poet, eldest son of Samuel Taylor Coleridge
 October – John Gardiner Calkins Brainard, (died 1828), American lawyer, editor and poet
 October 24 – August Graf von Platen (died 1835), German
 Eliza Dunlop (died 1880), Irish-born Australian poet, translator and ethnographer

Deaths
Birth years link to the corresponding "[year] in poetry" article:
 February 17 – James Macpherson (born 1736), Scottish poet, writer, literary collector and politician
 February 25 – Samuel Seabury (born 1729), American Episcopal bishop and poet
 May 3 – Robert Lovell (born 1771), English poet
 May 12 – Johann Uz (born 1720), German poet
 July 21 – Robert Burns (born 1759), Scottish poet and lyricist
 December 24 – John Maclaurin, Lord Dreghorn (born 1734), Scottish judge and poet
 John Codrington Bampfylde (born 1754), English poet
 Thomas Cole (born c.1726/7), English rural poet

See also

Poetry

Notes

18th-century poetry
Poetry